Nakka Khurd, also known as Purana Nakka, is a village in Jand Tehsil, Attock District, Punjab Province, Pakistan. 

It is located near Makhad Sharif, which is situated on the bank of the Indus River.

Climate 
Nakka Khurd is situated in the Potohar Plateau of Pakistan. In summer the weather gets very hot, and in the winter the temperature goes up to the freezing point. People keep goats and sheep in large amount and also camels.

References

External links
Attockonians

Villages in Attock District